Bhoot or Bhūta may refer to:

 Bhoot (ghost), the ghost of a deceased person or a disembodied spirit in the Indian subcontinent
 Bhoot (film), a 2003 Bollywood horror movie
 Mahābhūta, classical elements in Hindu and Buddhist philosophy also represented by the name Bhuta-Shakti or primordial states of matter and the connected spirits.
 Bhut jolokia, ghost pepper
 Bhut, Nawanshahr, a village in Shaheed Bhagat Singh Nagar district of Punjab State, India
 Bhoot – Part One: The Haunted Ship, a 2020 Bollywood film starring Vicky Kaushal